Thomas Oliver Dann (born 30 January 1981) was an English cricketer.  Tommy Dann was a right-handed batsman who played primarily as a wicketkeeper.  He was born at Cambridge, Cambridgeshire and was later educated at Millfield School.

Dann represented the Northamptonshire Cricket Board in List A cricket.  His debut List A match came against Northumberland in the 2000 NatWest Trophy.  From 2000 to 2001, he represented the Board in 4 List A matches, the last of which came against the Leicestershire Cricket Board in the 1st round of the 2002 Cheltenham & Gloucester Trophy which was played in 2001.  In his 4 List A matches, he scored 52 runs at a batting average of 26.00, with a high score of 27.  Behind the stumps he took 2 catches.

References

External links
Thomas Dann at Cricinfo
Thomas Dann at CricketArchive

1981 births
2021 deaths
Cricketers from Cambridgeshire
Sportspeople from Cambridge
People educated at Millfield
English cricketers
Northamptonshire Cricket Board cricketers
Wicket-keepers